Mary Polly Paʻaʻāina, also known as Mary ʻĪʻī ( – May 28, 1853) was a Hawaiian chiefess of the Kingdom of Hawaii. At a young age, she was chosen to attend the Chiefs' Children's School (later renamed Royal School) taught by the American missionary Amos Starr Cooke and his wife, Juliette Montague Cooke, alongside her half-sister Queen Emma of Hawaii and fourteen of her royal cousins.

Early life and education 

She was born circa 1833 to Henry Coleman Lewis and High Chiefess Fanny Kekelaokalani Young. Her mother was daughter of John Young, the British advisor of Kamehameha I. Her half-sister was Emma Rooke, who was three years younger than her and the daughter of her mother's marriage to George Naʻea. Her biological father Henry Coleman Lewis died in the first week of the influenza epidemic of 1845. She was adopted under the Hawaiian tradition of hānai by John Papa ʻĪʻī and his wife Sarai Hiwauli. Her hānai parents were lower-ranking aliʻi and her foster father also served as kahu (caretaker) to Princess Victoria Kamāmalu. Sources disagree on the spelling of her name. She was called "Polly Paaina" by the Cookes, while Liliʻuokalani called her  "Mary Paaina" in Hawaii's Story by Hawaii's Queen. The number of "a" letters in her name often varies.

Entering in May 1843, Paʻaʻāina was the fifteenth pupil and last girl to enter the Chiefs' Children's School (the last boy John William Pitt Kīnaʻu entered in 1844).
Along with her classmates, she was chosen by Kamehameha III to be eligible for the throne of the Kingdom of Hawaii. She was taught in English by American missionaries Amos Starr Cooke and his wife, Juliette Montague Cooke, alongside her royal cousins. She was taught reading, spelling, penmanship, arithmetic, geometry, algebra, physics, geography, history, bookkeeping, singing and English composition by the missionary couple. In the classroom students were divided by their age and/or length of time at the school. The older group consisted of Moses Kekūāiwa, Lot Kapuāiwa, Alexander Liholiho, William Charles Lunalilo, Jane Loeau, Bernice Pauahi, Abigail Maheha and Elizabeth Kekaʻaniau who had attended the school since 1839. The next class consisted of Emma Rooke, James Kaliokalani, Peter Kaʻeo and David Kalākaua. Due to her late attendance, Mary Paʻaʻāina was placed in the youngest class together with Victoria Kamāmalu, Lydia Kamakaʻeha (Liliʻuokalani), and John William Pitt Kīnaʻu. During their Sunday procession to church it was customary for boys and girls to walk side by side, Paʻaʻāina would walk beside her first cousin Peter Kaʻeo.

American merchant Gorham D. Gilman visited the Royal School in 1848 and gave a brief description of Paʻaʻāina:

Later life 
The boarding school was discontinued in 1850. Little detail is known about her adult life. She may have moved back briefly with her hānai parents to their new home Mililani in Honolulu. In 1851, Paʻaʻāina married American James Augustus Griswold (born September 20, 1826) in Honolulu, Oʻahu. The exact date of their marriage was either December 21 or December 30.
Their only child Mary Paʻaʻāina Griswold (March 19, 1853 – aft 1900) married twice: her first marriage was to Lewis Albert in San Francisco, 1871 and her second marriage was to Charles Ellet Kellogg in Honolulu, April 15, 1886. By her first marriage, Griswold had a daughter named Edith G. Albert (born September 18, 1872).

In 1853, Paʻaʻāina fell ill and after much suffering from a lingering illness, died at Princess Victoria Kamāmalu's residence on May 28, 1853 of scrofulous complaints. Her funeral was held the next day at Mililani, the residence of her hānai father John Papa ʻĪʻī.
The missionary newspaper Friends described her last days:
Her sufferings during her last sickness were extreme. She felt conscious of danger, and, as far as human eye could see, prepared herself for her departure. She took a calm and effecting [sic] leave of her friends that were present, and sent her last message to absent ones. She expressed the wish that others whom she loved would prepare while in health for the trying hour of death. "Dearest Mary thou hast left us, Here thy loss we deeply feel, But ‘tis God who hath bereft us, He can all our sorrow heal."

See also 
John Young (Hawaii) family tree

References

Bibliography 

1833 births
1853 deaths
Royalty of the Hawaiian Kingdom
House of Keliimaikai
Hawaiian adoptees (hānai)
19th-century deaths from tuberculosis
Royal School (Hawaii) alumni
Tuberculosis deaths in Hawaii